The Park of Builders (Russian: Парк строителей) also the Park of Culture of Builders is one of the parks of Rostov-on-Don, which was laid at the beginning of the 20th century on the place of the philistine farmstead. The park is located in the Oktyabrsky district of the city.

History 
Earlier the Novoposelensky garden was in the place of the park of Builders. It was founded in 1903 during the construction of the building of the People's Theater. Earlier in this place was the estate of the petty bourgeois Garbuz and near the estate was Garbuz Garden, named after the owner of the estate. On the territory of the garden were planted whole sites with fruit trees. It was possible to get to Novopoliselensky garden from several sides because there were several entrances. The first entrance was from Budyonnovsky Prospekt, and it was considered the main entrance. The second was located from Pochtovy Lane opposite to 5th Street.

From the street of the 6th was located 2 avenues, one went from a main entrance to the entrance from Pochtovy Lane and came to 5th Street. Other avenue went perpendicular to the first, began from a northern entrance with 6th Street, and reached the place where the closed platform was constructed later.

Over time a dance floor appeared in the south-western part of the park. Along the Postal Lane a summer restaurant was built on the territory from the entrance to the 6th street. The territory of the park was divided into squares it was crossed by tracks that were covered with tyrsa. Over time lime trees, acacias, ornamental shrubs and flower beds were planted here. The metal lattice was the first fencing of a garden, the brick fence appeared over time. On northeast side of the park was located the summer theater: a wooden design which contained the sliding blinds used for airing of the room.

As of 1909 the Novoposelensky garden was one of two existing gardens of Rostov-on-Don for city use - the second object of such a plan was called the City Garden. The territory of both gardens was occupied by plantings of trees, the total area of which occupied 13 acres of land. On the preserved plan of the city according to the edition of 1911, the territory of green plantations carried the name of Novoposelensky garden.

The territory of the Novoposelensky Garden in Rostov-on-Don was located between the Pochtovy Lane and Taganrog Avenue passed along Sixth Street- The documents preserved the mention of the garden created before 1917.

Then Novoposelensky garden was renamed and began to be called the park of V. Mayakovsky. It happened during the 1940s - 1950s. The District House of Officers of the North Caucasus Military District became its owner. During this period the park was well-planned and restored, flowerbeds were put in order, new green plantings appeared. The main alley of the park was asphalted and the lawns were cleaned. On the territory of the park there were new benches, volleyball and tennis courts were equipped. In the period from spring to autumn on the equipped film platform there took place viewing chronicle and documentary films.

In the 1960s the military left this place for a decade no one was engaged in the improvement of the park everything fell into decay. Under the mayor of the city G. Ye. Konovalov the fences around the park were broken. The park began to visit the citizens, as a result of which many flower beds and lawns were trampled, and benches and other objects were broken.

The park was renamed the Park of Cultures of Builders and was inaugurated on November 7, 1976. It again began to be visited by people and be considered a place of rest.

In 1987 a monument to the victims of Stalin's repressions appeared on the northern part of the park.

At the end of XX - at the beginning of the XXI century the park is in unsatisfactory condition. From the old paths, beds and layout in general, little is left. The decorative shrub and many other plantings and objects were destroyed.

References

Literature

Tourist attractions in Rostov-on-Don
Parks in Rostov-on-Don
Parks in Russia